Subbalakshmi  is an acclaimed Carnatic musician, composer and an actress in Malayalam movies. She is one of the prominent supporting actresses currently handling grand mother roles in Malayalam movies. She is noted for her performance in Kalyanaraman (2002), Pandippada (2005) and Nandanam (2002). Her daughter Thara Kalyan is also an actress in Malayalam movies.

Personal life

She was married to late Kalyanakrishnan. The couple has two daughters and one son. Her younger daughter Thara Kalyan is also a famous actress and an acclaimed dancer. Subbalakshmi, prior to entering movies, was a music and dance instructor at Jawahar Balabhavan and has worked with All India Radio since 1951. She is noted for being the first lady composer of All India Radio from south India. She has done many concerts and is a dubbing artist as well. She has acted in some telefilms and albums.

Partial filmography

As actress
Appeared in more than 75 films

 Malayalam films
Nandanam (2002) as Veshamani Ammal (Malayalam)  Debut
Kalyanaraman (2002) as Karthyayyani
Thilakkam  (2003) as Ammu's grandmother
Gramaphone (2003) as Gregory's mother
Saudhamini (2003) as Kunjulakshmiyamma
C.I.D. Moosa (2003) as Meena's grandmother  
Maanikyan (2005) as Ammomma
Rappakal (2005) as Valiya Varma's Wife
Pandippada (2005) as Meena's Grandmother 
Classmates (2006) as Special appearance in the song (old lady)
Note Book (2006)
Kalabham (2006) as Alamelu Ammal
Ravanan (2006) as Muthassi 
Romeoo (2007) as Bhama's grandmother  
Ali Bhai (2007) as Old lady in the colony 
Chocolate (2007) as Dance Teacher
Mulla (2008) as Old lady
Meghatheertham (2009) as Artist
Chattambinaadu (2009) as Old lady in village
Seetha Kalyanam (2009) as Abhirami's grandmother
Yugapurushan (2010) as Antharjanam
Marykkundoru Kunjaadu (2010) as Bus Passenger
Neelambari (2010) as Paatti
Note Out (2011) as Maya's grandmother
 Lakshmi Vilasam Renuka Makan Raghuram (2012) as Old woman
Thalsamayam Oru Penkutty (2012) as TV Audient
Load Shedding (2013) as Ravi's mother
Oru Yathrayil (2013) - {Segment : I Love Appa} as Paatti 
Sound Thoma (2013) as Seller
Swaasam (2013) as Meera's grandmother
Koothara (2014) as Koobrin's Valyammachi
Cherukkanum Pennum (2014) as
Pranayakatha (2014) as Reetha's grandmother
Avarude Veedu (2014) as Old lady
Nakshathrangal (2014)  as Madhaviyamma
69 (2014) as Grandmother
Murukku (2014) as Lady 
Chirakodinja Kinavukal (2015) as Old lady
Rudrasimhasanam (2015) as Grandmother
Oru New Generation Pani (2015) as Rachana's paatti
Rani Padmini (2015) as Rani's grandmother
Ivan Maryadaraman (2015) as Old guest
Aakashavani (2016) as Vani's grandmother
1948 Kaalam Paranjathu (2019) as Antharjanam
Jack & Daniel (2019) as Muthassi
Jimmy Ee Veedinte Aishwaryam (2019) as Special appearance in a song /Singer 
One (2021) as Ramya's grandmother
 Star (2021) as Devi Muthassi
Pachathappu as Meenakshiyamma
Chakkarappazham
Therottam 
Oru Vaathil Kotta
Kaakan
Mallanum Mathevanum

 Telugu films
Kalyana Ramudu (2003) as Karthyayyani 
Ye Maaya Chesave (2010) as Jessie's Grandmother

 Hindi films
Jagat Jogini Maa Khodiyar (2006) as Mamaniya's wife 
Ekk Deewana Tha (2012) as Jessie's Grandmother 
Dil Bechara (2020) as Manny's grandmother

 Tamil films
Oru Ponnu Oru Paiyan (2007) as Viswanathan's sister  
Raman Thediya Seethai (2008) as Gayathri's paatti
Vinnaithaandi Varuvaayaa (2010) as Jessie's grandmother
Ore Oru Raja Mokkaraja (2015) as Paatti
Ammani (2016) as Ammani (Title role) 
House Owner (2019) as Radha's grandmother
Beast (2022) as hostage

 Kannada films
Honganasu (2008) (Kannada)

 Sanskrit films
Madhurasmitham

 English film

As Dubbing artist
 Jack & Daniel (2019) - Old lady passenger in the road
 Rock n' Roll (2007) - Chandramouli's mother (Vanitha Krishnachandran) - Song bit

As playback singer
 "Entadukke Vannadukkum" as Marykkundoru Kunjaadu	(2010)
 "Kanne Kannarakkanave" as Rudrasimhasanam (2015)
 "Mazhai Ingillaye" as  Ammani (2016)
 "Super Sundaran" as  Jimmy Ee Veedinte Aiswaryam (2019)
 Peythoriyathe

Television serials
Appeared in more than 65 TV Serials

 Malayalam serials
 Valayam (DD Malayalam)
 Gandharvayamam (DD Malayalam)
 Ramettan (DD Malayalam)
 Kudumbasametham Manikutty (Jaihind TV)
 Kathanar Kadamattathu Kathanar (Jaihind TV)
 Kudumbapuranam (Jaihind TV)
 Bhagyalakshmi (Surya TV)
 Velankani Mathavu  (Surya TV)
 Sreeguruvaayoorappan (Surya TV)
Kuttichathan (Surya TV)
 Dream City (Surya TV)
 Snehakkoodu (Surya TV)
 Ishtam (Surya TV)
 Amme Mahamaye (Surya TV)
  Sahayathrika (Surya TV)
 Thenum Vayambum (Surya TV)
 Ente Maathavu (Surya TV)
 Kunjikkoonan (Asianet)
 Swami Ayyapan (Asianet)
Sreemahabhagavatham (Asianet)
Devi Mahathmyam (Asianet)
 Amma (Asianet)
 Kadamattathu Kathanar (Asianet)
 Seetha Kalyanam (Asianet)
 Njangal Santhushtarannu (Asianet Plus)
 Manasu Parayunna Karyangal (Mazhavil Manorama)
 Aayirathil Oruval (Mazhavil Manorama)
 Oru Penninte Katha (Mazhavil Manorama)
 Aniyathi (Mazhavil Manorama)
 Sooryakaladi (Amrita TV)
 Mahaguru (Kaumudy TV)
 {Telefilm} (Kairali TV)
 Tamil serials
 Perazhagi (Colors Tamil)
 Bharatidasan Colony (Star Vijay)

TV/Radio/Online Shows

 Comedy Thillana
 Ammamrude Samsthana Sammelanam
 Panam Tharum Padam
 Annies Kitchen
 Bhavad Navarathri
 Humorous Talk Show
 Katha Ithuvare
 Sreekandan Nair Show
 Varthaprabhatham
 Ladies Hour
 Comedy Sthreekal
 Sundari Neeyum Sundaran Njanum
 Laughing Villa Season 2 as Muthassi
 Comedy Nights
 Dr.Lakshmi Nairum Adukkalayil Ninnu Arangathekku
 Celebrity's Kitchen
 D2
 Onnum Onnum Moonu
 Sangeethika
 Malayali Darbar
 Annorikkal
 Tharattu
 JB Junction
 Prabhatha Kairali
 Asianet TV Awards
 Comedy Stars
 Comedy Super Nite 2
 Lakshmi Ramakrishnan Channel
 Chembai Festival
 Red FM Malayalam Music Awards 2018
 Ladies Band
 Golden Years of Doordarshan
 Samdooram
 Ormmayile Vishu
 Behindwoods Ice
 Salt and Pepper
 Red Carpet
 Amma Bharatham
 Sowbhagya Venkitesh Youtube Channel
 Thara Kalyan Youtube Channel
 Star Comedy Magic
 Zee Malayalam News

Advertisements
Appeared in more than 65 advertisements

 Lays
 Horlicks
 Grandmas
 Popy
 Tanishq Kolam
 Atham Pathu Ruchi
 Kalyan Jewellers
 Nerolac Paints
 Moon Beauty Parlour
 Swagath Kalyana Mandapam
 Ammaveedu
 Surf Excel Quick Wash
 Vanitha
 Mandharakkavu

Albums
Thulasimanam

Awards
 Sangita Nataka Academy Award
 M. S. Subbulakshmi Award
 Alive Golden Years Award 2019

Features

 Indian Express
 On Manorama 
 Mathrubhumi 
 Indiagltiz 
 The News Minute 
 Filmibeat

References

External links

Subbalakshmi at MSI

Actresses from Chennai
Actresses in Malayalam cinema
Indian film actresses
Malayalam playback singers
Living people
1950 births
Indian women playback singers
Indian television actresses
Actresses in Malayalam television
Singers from Chennai
21st-century Indian actresses
Female models from Kerala
Tamil television actresses
Actresses in Tamil cinema
Actresses in Telugu cinema
Actresses in Kannada cinema
Actresses in Hindi cinema
Indian voice actresses
Actresses in Tamil television